The Karl Limper Geology Museum is located in Shideler Hall at Miami University in Oxford, Ohio.  It is located off the lobby on the main level of the building.  The museum was established in 1968 and contains a collection of ore minerals, meteorites, and a 16 inch trilobite.  Much of the basis of the collection was collected by William H. Shideler, founder of Miami's geology program.  The museum was funded by donations from alumni including James Wolff.

External links
Limper Museum Website

Geology museums in the United States
Miami University
Natural history museums in Ohio
Museums in Butler County, Ohio
University museums in Ohio
Museums established in 1968
Paleontology in Ohio